Bogát (Eng: Bogat) was a 10th century Hungarian General, according to Liudprand, Bogát was one of the leaders of the 921–922 Italian Campaign under the name Busak. According to Makkai László, he then became the first Gyula of Transylvania. Gyula Kristó explains the origin of his name from the Slavic word ("rich").

Personal life 
In 921–922, at the invitation of King Berengar I, Hungarian troops took part in the Italian civil wars. After 899–900, it was the second largest campaign in Italy. According to Liudprand, some Italian counts (Count Adalbert, Palatine- Count Odelrik, Count Gislebert and others) wanted to ivnite King Rudolph II of Burgundy to the Italian throne. The Hungarians, led by Dursak (Tarhacsi) and Bogat, rushed Berengar's unsuspecting opponents near Verona, killed Odelrik, and captured Adalbert and Gislebert. The Hungarians then made their way to southern Italy, and on February 4, 922, already under Byzantine authority, from Apulia.

Anonymus mistakenly calls him Bulcsú's father.

Gyula of Transylvania 
In his work Anonymus, he strongly mixed personal names and names of dignitaries (Gyula, Harka). from the time of the conquest. From a detailed analysis of place name data, it is likely that the first Gyula in Transylvania was the Bogát prince (Bugat rex), who, according to Liudprand Antapodosis, helped King Berengar I in 921 while accompanied by "Dursac rex" (probably Árpád's son Tarkacsu) with a Hungarian army. In this case, disentangling Anonymus' data, the order of inheritance emerges according to which the ancestor of the Transylvanian Gyulas is Harka Tétény and his son Harka Bogát, who was elevated to the dignity of Gyula when he moved from the western part of the Carpathian Basin to Transylvania around 921, and his son was Gyula Zombor, the ancestor of the Zsombor family.

References

Sources 
 

 Liudprand: Liudprand:  Antapodosis. magyarzenetortenet.hu (in Hungarian) (Hozzáférés: 2020. okt. 13.) arch

 

 

European nobility
Magyar tribal chieftains
Hungarian nobility
10th-century Hungarian people